The Republican Study Committee (RSC) is a study group of conservative members of the Republican Party in the United States House of Representatives. In November 2022, Representative Kevin Hern of Oklahoma was elected as the Chairman of the RSC, effective as of January 2023.

Although the primary functions of the RSC vary from year to year, it has always pushed for significant cuts in non-defense spending, advocated socially conservative legislation, and supported the right to keep and bear arms. It has proposed an alternative budget every year since 1995. In 2007, in conjunction with the unveiling of its "Taxpayer Bill of Rights", it presented an alternative budget resolution that claimed would balance the budget within five years without increasing income taxes.

Entering the 117th United States Congress, the RSC was the largest ideological caucus in Congress of either party.

Initiatives 
The RSC's key legislative initiatives are detailed in the American Taxpayer Bill of Rights, unveiled in March 2007.
 Taxpayers have a right to have a federal government that does not grow beyond their ability to pay for it.
 Taxpayers have a right to receive back each dollar that they entrust to the government for their retirement.
 Taxpayers have a right to expect the government to balance the budget without having their taxes raised.
 Taxpayers have a right to a simple, fair tax code that they can understand.

History 
The RSC was founded in 1973 by Paul Weyrich and other conservative activists to keep a watch on the House Republican leadership, which they saw at the time as too moderate. Their formation mirrored the rise of the Democratic Study Group, a liberal force in the Democratic Caucus founded in 1959. The group's first chairman was Phil Crane of Illinois.

The group briefly dissolved in 1995 when Newt Gingrich abolished it and other similar groups  after the Republicans won control of the House for the first time in 40 years. It was soon resurrected as the Conservative Action Team (CATs) by Dan Burton of Indiana (the last chairman of the original RSC), Sam Johnson of Texas, John Doolittle of California and Ernest Istook of Oklahoma. These four founders alternated as chairmen throughout the next two Congresses until David McIntosh of Indiana became chairman in 1998.

Paul Teller spent over 10 years as Executive Director of RSC. He was fired in December 2013 by Chairman Steve Scalise for divulging member conversations. Teller had been working with two outside groups in opposition to a budget deal forged by Paul Ryan and Patty Murray.

Chairs 
 1973–1989: Phil Crane (IL-12)
 1989–1995: Dan Burton (IN-6)
 1995–1999: Dan Burton (IN-6), John Doolittle (CA-4), Ernest Istook (OK-5), Sam Johnson (TX-3)
 1999–2000: David M. McIntosh (IN-2)
 2000–2001: Sam Johnson (TX-3)
 2001–2003: John Shadegg (AZ-4)
 2003–2005: Sue Myrick (NC-9)
 2005–2007: Mike Pence (IN-6)
 2007–2009: Jeb Hensarling (TX-5)
 2009–2011: Tom Price (GA-6)
 2011–2013: Jim Jordan (OH-4)
 2013–2014: Steve Scalise (LA-1)
 2014–2015: Rob Woodall (GA-7)
 2015–2017: Bill Flores (TX-17)
 2017–2019: Mark Walker (NC-6)
 2019–2021: Mike Johnson (LA-4)
 2021–2023: Jim Banks (IN-3)
 2023–present: Kevin Hern (OK-1)

Connections 
The organization has had ties to outside groups allied with conservative elements of the Republican Party, such as the National Rifle Association, the Heritage Foundation, Focus on the Family, Concerned Women for America, the conservative magazine National Review, and the libertarian Cato Institute.

A subgroup of the committee, the Values Action Team, coordinates legislation with religious organizations, including the Christian right. It has been headed by Joe Pitts of Pennsylvania since its formation in 1997.

The RSC membership list is available at the group's website. It counts former Vice Presidents Mike Pence, Dan Quayle and Dick Cheney and former House Majority Leader Tom DeLay among its former members. In addition, at least four sitting senators—Pat Toomey (PA), Richard Burr (NC), John Boozman (AR), and Roger Wicker (MS)—were members of the RSC while serving in the House. At least three former governors–Pence (IN), Butch Otter (ID) and Bobby Jindal (LA)—were also members.

Political issues 
On June 16, 2010, the committee issued a press release critical of the administration of U.S. President Barack Obama for negotiating an agreement with energy company BP to waive the $75 million federal limit on oil company liability for oil spills. The statement called the agreement requiring BP to set aside $20 billion to pay damage claims for the Deepwater Horizon oil spill a "Chicago-style political shakedown" by the White House.

In June 2015, the Republican Study Committee reacted to the Supreme Court decision that legalized same-sex marriage, calling it "a loss for democratic self-government" and stating "we should work to promote the truth of marriage between a man and a woman."

In July 2013, the Republican Study Committee barred Heritage Foundation employees from attending its weekly meeting in the Capitol, reversing a decades-old policy, over disagreements about the farm bill.

In 2021, their policy positions included maintaining the Hyde Amendment, constructing a wall on the southern border, and ending perceived censorship of conservative-leaning content.

Membership

Current members 

Alabama
 Jerry Carl (AL-1)
 Barry Moore (AL-2)
 Mike Rogers (AL-3)
 Robert Aderholt (AL-4)
 Dale Strong (AL-5)
 Gary Palmer (AL-6)
Arizona
 Paul Gosar  (AZ-4)
 David Schweikert (AZ-6)
 Debbie Lesko  (AZ-8)
Arkansas
 French Hill (AR-2)
 Bruce Westerman (AR-4)
California
 Doug LaMalfa (CA-1)
 Kevin Kiley (CA-3)
 Tom McClintock (CA-4)
 Jay Obernolte (CA-8)
 Mike Garcia (CA-25)
 Darrell Issa (CA-50)
Colorado
 Lauren Boebert (CO-3)
 Ken Buck (CO-4)
 Doug Lamborn (CO-5)
Florida
 Neal Dunn (FL-2)
 Kat Cammack (FL-3)
 Aaron Bean (FL-4)
 Michael Waltz (FL-6)
 Bill Posey (FL-8)
 Daniel Webster (FL-11)
 Gus Bilirakis (FL-12)
 Anna Paulina Luna (FL-13)
 Laurel Lee (FL-15)
 Vern Buchanan (FL-16)
 Greg Steube (FL-17)
 Scott Franklin (FL-18)
 Byron Donalds (FL-19)
 Brian Mast (FL-21)
 Carlos A. Giménez (FL-26)
Georgia
 Buddy Carter (GA-1)
 Drew Ferguson (GA-3)
 Rich McCormick (GA-6)
 Austin Scott (GA-8)
 Andrew Clyde (GA-9)
 Barry Loudermilk (GA-11)
 Rick Allen (GA-12)
 Marjorie Taylor Greene (GA-14)
Idaho
 Russ Fulcher (ID-1)
Illinois
 Mike Bost  (IL-12)
 Mary Miller (IL-15)
 Darin LaHood (IL-18)
Indiana
 Rudy Yakym (IN-2)
 Jim Banks  (IN-3)
 Jim Baird (IN-4)
 Victoria Spartz (IN-5)
 Larry Bucshon  (IN-8)
 Erin Houchin (IN-9)
Iowa
 Ashley Hinson (IA-1)
 Zach Nunn (IA-3)
 Randy Feenstra (IA-4)
Kansas
 Tracey Mann (KS-1)
 Jake LaTurner (KS-2)
 Ron Estes (KS-4)
Kentucky
 James Comer (KY-1)
 Brett Guthrie (KY-2)
 Andy Barr (KY-6)
Louisiana
 Steve Scalise (LA-1)
 Clay Higgins (LA-3)
 Mike Johnson (LA-4)
 Julia Letlow (LA-5)
 Garret Graves (LA-6)
Michigan
 Jack Bergman (MI-1)
 Bill Huizenga (MI-2)
 John Moolenaar (MI-4)
 Tim Walberg (MI-7)
 Lisa McClain (MI-9)
 John James (MI-10)
Minnesota
 Tom Emmer (MN-6)
 Michelle Fischbach (MN-7)
 Pete Stauber (MN-8)
Mississippi
 Trent Kelly (MS-1)
 Michael Guest (MS-3)
 Mike Ezell (MS-4) 
Missouri
 Ann Wagner (MO-2)
 Blaine Luetkemeyer (MO-3)
 Mark Alford (MO-4) 
 Eric Burlison (MO-7)
 Jason Smith (MO-8)
Montana
 Matt Rosendale (MT-02)
Nebraska
 Mike Flood (NE-1)
 Don Bacon (NE-2)
New York
 Nick LaLota (NY-1)
 Nicole Malliotakis (NY-11)
 Elise Stefanik (NY-21)
 Brandon Williams (NY-22)
 Nick Langworthy (NY-23)
 Claudia Tenney (NY-24)
North Carolina
 Greg Murphy  (NC-3)
 Virginia Foxx (NC-5)
 David Rouzer (NC-7)
 Dan Bishop (NC-8)
 Richard Hudson (NC-9)
 Patrick McHenry (NC-10)
North Dakota
 Kelly Armstrong (ND-AL)
Ohio
 Brad Wenstrup (OH-2)
 Bob Latta (OH-5)
 Bill Johnson (OH-6)
 Warren Davidson (OH-8)
 Mike Turner (OH-10)
 Troy Balderson (OH-12)
 Mike Carey (OH-15)
Oklahoma
 Kevin Hern (OK-1)
 Josh Brecheen (OK-2) 
 Tom Cole (OK-4)
Oregon
 Cliff Bentz (OR-2)
Pennsylvania
 Dan Meuser (PA-9)
 Lloyd Smucker (PA-11)
 John Joyce (PA-13)
 Guy Reschenthaler (PA-14)
 Mike Kelly (PA-16)
South Carolina
 Joe Wilson (SC-2)
 Jeff Duncan (SC-3)
 William Timmons (SC-4)
 Ralph Norman (SC-5)
 Russell Fry (SC-7) 
South Dakota
 Dusty Johnson (SD-AL)
Tennessee
 Diana Harshbarger (TN-1)
 Tim Burchett (TN-2)
 Chuck Fleischmann (TN-3)
 Scott DesJarlais  (TN-4)
 Andy Ogles (TN-5)
 John Rose (TN-6)
 Mark Green  (TN-7)
 David Kustoff (TN-8)
Texas
 Nathaniel Moran (TX-1
 Dan Crenshaw (TX-2)
 Keith Self (TX-3) 
 Pat Fallon (TX-4)
 Lance Gooden (TX-5)
 Morgan Luttrell (TX-8) 
 Michael McCaul (TX-10)
 August Pfluger (TX-11)
 Kay Granger (TX-12)
 Ronny Jackson  (TX-13)
 Randy Weber (TX-14)
 Monica de la Cruz (TX-15)
 Jodey Arrington (TX-19)
 Chip Roy  (TX-21)
 Troy Nehls (TX-22)
 Tony Gonzales (TX-23)
 Beth Van Duyne (TX-24)
 Roger Williams (TX-25)
 Michael C. Burgess (TX-26)
 Michael Cloud  (TX-27)
 John Carter (TX-31)
 Brian Babin (TX-36)
Utah
 Blake Moore (UT-1)
 Chris Stewart (UT-2)
 John Curtis (UT-3)
 Burgess Owens (UT-4)
Virginia
 Rob Wittman (VA-1)
 Bob Good  (VA-5)
 Ben Cline (VA-6)
Washington
 Dan Newhouse (WA-4)
 Cathy McMorris Rodgers  (WA-5)
West Virginia
 Alex Mooney (WV-2)
Wisconsin
 Bryan Steil (WI-1)
 Scott L. Fitzgerald (WI-5)
 Glenn Grothman (WI-6)
 Tom Tiffany (WI-7)
Wyoming
 Harriet Hageman (WY-AL)

Former members 
 Dan Burton of Indiana
 Phil Crane of Illinois
 John Doolittle of California
 Sam Johnson of Texas
 David M. McIntosh  of Indiana
 Sue Myrick  of North Carolina
 Mike Pence of Indiana
 Bruce Poliquin of Maine
 Jeb Hensarling of Texas
 Tom Price of Georgia
 Jim Jordan of Ohio
 Jackie Walorski of Indiana
 Rob Woodall of Georgia
 Bill Flores of Texas
 Mark Walker  of North Carolina
 Jim Hagedorn of Minnesota

See also 
 Congressional Progressive Caucus
 Freedom Caucus
 Liberty Caucus
 Republican Main Street Partnership
 Tea Party Caucus
 Tuesday Group

References

External links 
 

Ideological caucuses of the United States Congress
Study Committee
1973 establishments in Washington, D.C.
Conservative organizations in the United States
Organizations established in 1973